Dísert Óengusa is a medieval hermitage and National Monument located in County Limerick, Ireland.

Location

History

Óengus of Tallaght (Óengus mac Óengobann, Óengus the Culdee, d. 824) is believed to have founded the hermitage in AD 780, leaving it two years later. It was associated with the Culdees.

The monastery is mentioned in the annals for 1033. Some early ruins on the site have been dated to the early 11th century.

The round tower was built in the 12th century. The present church, with antae, dates back to the 15th or 16th century. The church was abandoned in later centuries and fell into ruin.

Local folklore claimed the tower had been erected in a single night by a witch. It was visited and sketched by John Windele in 1833. Restoration work was carried out in 2019.

Remains

References

Culdees
Christian monasteries in the Republic of Ireland
Religion in County Limerick
Archaeological sites in County Limerick
National Monuments in County Limerick
Towers in the Republic of Ireland
Religious buildings and structures completed in 780